GridCase (stylized as GRiDCASE) is a line of rugged tablets and laptops by Grid Systems Corporation released as a successor of the GRiD Compass line.

History 
The first model was released in 1985.

The notable model - GRiDCASE 1535EXP - is a rugged laptop designed for NASA to be used in space, and becomes the first rugged portable PC to attain full TEMPEST accreditation from the NSA.

Models

Former line

GRiDCASE 2 
1985; low-contrast LCD screen with green background (instead of orange/yellow plasma screen with black background on a Compass laptops).

This model was based on a MSDOS 2.11 and a bunch of apps burned on ROM that fit in the ROM tray in front.

GRiDCASE 3 
1986; returning to a plasma screens (but with red/orange text color and wide aspect ratio). The internal power supply can be ejected and a battery-pack is installed in its place.

3D view:http://vintage-laptops.com/en/grid-case-3

GRiDCASE 3 Tempest 
1986; the rugged version of GRiDCASE 3 with electromagnetic protection.

3D view:http://vintage-laptops.com/en/grid-case-tempest

GRiDCASE 1520 
1988; can be equipped with plasma or LCD screen. 

Was based on a 286 CPU.

3D view:http://vintage-laptops.com/en/grid-case-1520

GRiDCASE 1530 

The modification of 1530 - the Grid GRiDCASE 1535EXP is a rugged laptop with a 80386 CPU, an optional 80387 floating point processor and up to 8 Mbyte of DRAM. It was first flown into space in December 1992 on the STS-53 for use of the HERCULES geolocation device.

The another modification - the Grid GRiDCASE 1537EXP - has another screen (640x480 instead of 640x400, but with less physical size).

The power input is 100-240 V AC 50/60/400 Hz, 80 W. The 400 Hz utility frequency is common on airplanes and submarines.

3D view:http://vintage-laptops.com/en/grid-case-1537e

GRiDCASE 1550 
1990; This model has integrated pointing device, an was based on a Intel 80386sx processor.

The 1550sx wersion has 4M RAM, have a 100 M hard disk, a 1.44 M floppy drive, a hardly visible B/W VGA-LCD screen, a built in 2400 bps modem and weights 5.5 Kg (12 lbs.) without battery or power supply.

3D view:http://vintage-laptops.com/en/grid-case-1550sx

Tandy GRiD laptops 

In the period from 1990-1994, the Tandy Corp. together with the GRiD Systems Corp.produced the following models:

GRiD 1450SX -3D view:http://vintage-laptops.com/en/grid-1450sx

GRiD 1810 -3D view:http://vintage-laptops.com/en/grid-1810

GRiD 1660 and 1660C -3D view:http://vintage-laptops.com/en/grid-1660

GRiD 1680 and 1680C -3D view:http://vintage-laptops.com/en/grid-1680

GRiD 1720, 1750, 1755 -3D view:http://vintage-laptops.com/en/grid-1755

GRiD 4025N and 4025NC -3D view:http://vintage-laptops.com/en/grid-4025nc

GRiD Defence Systems GRiDCASE 
Reintroduced in 1995 line.

GRiDCASE 1580 
Also have Tempest version (1580T).

Pentium and pointing stick (initial model, 1995) or Pentium II and touchpad (1580 XGA, 1998).

3D view:http://vintage-laptops.com/en/grid-case-1580

3D view:http://vintage-laptops.com/en/grid-case-1580-tempest

3D view:https://vintage-laptops.com/en/grid-case-1580-XGA

GRiDCASE 1590

GRiDCASE 1510

See also 
 GRiDPad
GRiD SE-T
GRiD Lite

References 

Grid Systems laptops